The Bras de Riche (in English: Arm of Rich) flows in the municipalities of Saint-Cyrille-de-Lessard, Saint-Aubert and L'Islet (Saint-Eugène sector), in the L'Islet Regional County Municipality, in the administrative region of Chaudière-Appalaches, in Quebec, in Canada.

The "Bras de Riche" is a tributary of the east bank of the Bras Saint-Nicolas, which flows on the south-east bank of the rivière du Sud (Montmagny); the latter flows north-east to the south shore of the St. Lawrence River.

Geography 
The main neighboring watersheds of Bras de Riche are:
 north side: Sauvage stream, Tortue River (L'Islet);
 east side: Bras de la rivière Ouelle, Bras du Nord-Est, Tenturette River, Grand Calder River;
 south side: Bras d'Apic, Bras du Nord-Est, Méchant Pouce River;
 west side: Petit Moulin River (L'Islet), rivière des Perdrix, Bras Saint-Nicolas.

The "Bras de Riche" takes its source at Lake Bringé, located in a mountainous area, located at the limit between Saint-Cyrille-de-Lessard and Saint-Aubert.

  southwesterly in Saint-Cyrille-de-Lessard, to the municipal limit of Saint-Aubert;
  southwesterly, up to the limit of Saint-Cyrille-de-Lessard;
  south-west, to a country road;
  southwest, to route 285;
  towards the west, collecting the waters of the Bras du Nord-Est (coming from the south), until the limit between Saint-Cyrille-de-Lessard and L'Islet (Saint-Eugène sector);
  northwesterly, up to its confluence.

The "Bras de Riche" empties on the east bank of the Bras Saint-Nicolas.

Toponymy 
The toponym "Bras de Riche" was made official on May 31, 1983, at the Commission de toponymie du Québec.

See also 

 List of rivers of Quebec

References 

Rivers of Chaudière-Appalaches
L'Islet Regional County Municipality